"Amin" (Greek: Αμήν) is a single released by Greek pop singer Anna Vissi in 1995.  The single featured "Amin" which later appeared on the repackaged edition of her popular album Re!, as well as the track "Eleni", which Anna Vissi dedicated to her fan Eleni Karkanta. Music and lyrics for both tracks are by Nikos Karvelas.

Track listing
"Amin" (Αμήν; Amen) - 4:24
"Eleni" (Ελένη; Helen) - 4:54

References

See also

Anna Vissi songs
Songs written by Nikos Karvelas
1995 singles
1995 songs